Isiah Manuel Warner is the Boyd and Phillip W. West Professor of Surface and Analytical Chemistry and the Vice President for Strategic Initiatives at Louisiana State University. He’s also a professor at the Howard Hughes Medical Institute. Warner has won numerous national and international awards for chemistry and mentoring of students in the sciences. He has published over 350 refereed publications and has several patents.

Biography
Isiah Warner was born in Bunkie, Louisiana in 1946. He is a graduate of Southern University where he received his BS degree in Chemistry. Warner received his doctorate in Analytical Chemistry from the University of Washington in 1977. Following a post-doctoral research experience, Warner started his academic career at Texas A&M University where he was the first African American Chemistry faculty, and where received tenure and promotion to Associate Professor. Following receipt of tenure and promotion, Warner moved his research laboratory to Emory University and was promoted to full professor in 1986. In 1992, Warner returned to Louisiana and serves as the Phillip W. West Professor of Surface and Analytical Chemistry at Louisiana State University. He is currently the Vice President of Strategic Initiatives at LSU and serves as a Howard Hughes Medical Institute Professor.

Warner received an honorary doctorate from Marquette University.  He has been recognized for his chemical research and mentoring. Warner was named a fellow of the American Chemical Society in 2009. He is a recipient of the NOBCChE Percy L. Julian Award.

Research and Mentoring 
Warner is an analytical/materials Chemist, with research focuses on fluorescence spectroscopy, organized media, and ionic liquid chemistry, particularly as applied to solid phase materials. He is known for his mentoring of Chemistry students, and focus on the advancement of women and chemists of color. He has won numerous awards for his mentoring including. He has graduated 67 PhD students from his group, including a significant number of women and minorities, helping to make Louisiana State University the leader in producing women and African American PhD students.

Personal life 
Warner was born in 1946 in DeQuincy, Louisiana to Humphrey and Erma Warner. His interest in science started young, when he conducted his first experiment by drinking kerosene to see why it created light. He and his wife, Della Blount Warner, have three children: Isiah Jr., Edward and Chideha.

Honours, decorations, awards and distinctions
2018: Nature Award for Mentoring in Science. 
 2016: SEC Professor of the Year
 2016: American Academy of Arts and Sciences Member
 2015: Iddles Lectureship
 2014: Oesper Award
 2014: American Chemical Society (ACS) Division of Professional Relations Henry Hill Award for Outstanding Contributions to Professionalism
 2014: Stanley C. Israel Regional Award for Advancing Diversity in Chemical Sciences (ACS), November 19, 2013
 2013: American Chemical Society Award in Analytical Chemistry
 2010: Society for Applied Spectroscopy (SAS) Fellow
 2009:  American Chemical Society Fellow – Inaugural Class
 2008: ACS Division of Analytical Chemistry Award in Spectrochemical Analysis
 2007: Association of Analytical Chemists (Anachem) Award
 2005: Marquette University, honorary Doctor of Science degree
 2005: Charles E. Coates Award – ACS local section
 2005: Tuskegee University George Washington Carver Achievement Award
 2004: University of Washington, College of Arts & Sciences, Distinguished Alumnus Award
 2000: CASE Louisiana Teacher of the Year Award 
 2000: LSU Distinguished Faculty Award
 1988: Percy L. Julian Award
 1997: Presidential Award for Excellence in Science, Mathematics, and Engineering Mentoring

Selected Bibliography

References

External links
 Google Scholar References
 Research Group Website
 History Makers Interview
 LSU Office of Strategic Initiatives Website

Living people
20th-century American chemists
21st-century American chemists
African-American chemists
Southern University alumni
University of Washington alumni
Louisiana State University faculty
1946 births
20th-century African-American scientists
21st-century African-American scientists